Zaymishche is a rural locality (a selo) in Klintsy, Bryansk Oblast, Russia. There are 53 streets.

Geography 
Zaymishche is located 4 km south of Klintsy (the district's administrative centre) by road. Sinkovka is the nearest rural locality.

References 

Rural localities in Klintsovsky District